Valere Ronald Fonteyne (born December 2, 1933) is a Canadian former professional ice hockey left winger. He played in the National Hockey League (NHL) from 1959 to 1972, serving the Detroit Red Wings (on two tours of duty), New York Rangers and Pittsburgh Penguins, and in the World Hockey Association (WHA) from 1972 to 1974 with the Alberta/Edmonton Oilers.

Playing career
While not an offensive star, Fonteyne was a hard-working and effective defensive forward. He is regarded as one of the cleanest players in National Hockey League history. In 820 NHL games spanning 13 seasons, he served a remarkable total of just 26 minutes in the penalty box. He went completely unpenalized in five different seasons, including three in a row from 1965–1968. In a further 149 World Hockey Association games he was assessed only two minor penalties. In his entire professional career, Fonteyne only received a single fighting penalty.

In his NHL career, Fonteyne scored 75 goals and 154 assists for 229 points in 820 games. He also played in 59 playoff games, scoring 3 goals and 10 assists. He made it to the Stanley Cup finals with the Detroit Red Wings in 1961, 1963 and 1966 but lost each time.

The Alberta native was the first player chosen by the then-Alberta Oilers in the 1972 WHA General Player Draft; he played two seasons in the WHA before ending his career. He was one of 130 former Oilers to appear in a post-game ceremony when the Edmonton Oilers played their final game at Rexall Place in April 2016 before moving to a new arena.

Career statistics

Regular season and playoffs

References

External links

1933 births
Living people
Baltimore Clippers players
Detroit Red Wings players
Edmonton Oilers (WHA) players
Medicine Hat Tigers players
New York Rangers players
Ice hockey people from Alberta
People from Wetaskiwin
Pittsburgh Hornets players
Pittsburgh Penguins players
Canadian ice hockey left wingers